The Church of the Sacred Heart of Jesus, Roscommon, is the parochial church for the parish of Roscommon in the Roman Catholic Diocese of Elphin.

Appraisal
The main church was completed in 1903 and the steeple was added in 1916. The church has a flamboyant architectural design. It has rock-faced walls with sandstone dressings and features carved detailing, stained-glass and mosaics by Salviati.

Gallery

Bibliography
F. Francis Beirne The Diocese of Elphin, an illustrated history Booklink, 2007

See also
Sligo Cathedral (disambiguation)
Roscommon
Diocese of Elphin

References

Roman Catholic churches in County Roscommon
20th-century Roman Catholic church buildings in Ireland
Roman Catholic churches completed in 1903
20th-century churches in the Republic of Ireland